Piranë is a village in Prizren municipality, Kosovo. During the 15th century, the inhabitants of the village were recorded with characteristically Albanian anthroponomy, indicating that the village was historically inhabited by Albanians.

Notes

References 

Villages in Prizren